Cressex Community School is a cooperative trust secondary school in High Wycombe, Buckinghamshire. It is a foundation school, which takes children from the age of 6 through to the age of 23. The school has approximately 754 pupils.

Cressex Community School has formed a partnership with nearby Wycombe Abbey independent school, which enables pupils from both schools to work together.

The school was allocated £31 million of Government funding in 2007 to completely redevelop the site, which was falling into disrepair. The current site was opened in 2010.

References

External links
Department for Education Performance Tables 2011
 News report of a fire at the school in February 2008

Secondary schools in Buckinghamshire
High Wycombe
Foundation schools in Buckinghamshire